Henry Sutton Harmer (8 July 1883 – 9 January 1958) was a British athlete who competed at the 1908 Summer Olympics in London. He was born in West Ham and died in Sidmouth. His brother, Frederick Harmer, was also a British Olympian. In the 100 metres event, Harmer did not finish in his first round heat and was eliminated from competition.

References

Sources
 
 
 
 

1883 births
1958 deaths
Olympic athletes of Great Britain
Athletes (track and field) at the 1908 Summer Olympics
English male sprinters
People from West Ham
Athletes from London